"The Sweetness Lies Within" is a single from British indie rock band Hefner. The second single from their album Breaking God's Heart, it was released by Too Pure in 1998 on both a compact disc and vinyl record format.

The b-side "Hello Kitten" would quickly become a fan favorite, later being featured on the compilation album Boxing Hefner.

Track listing
The single was released in two formats.  The compact disc single contained all four songs, while the 7" single only contained the first two.

 "The Sweetness Lies Within"
 "Hello Kitten"
 "Normal Molly"
 "A Hymn for Berlin"

1998 singles
Hefner (band) songs
1998 songs
Too Pure singles